Deanhead Reservoir is a reservoir near Scammonden, in the metropolitan district of Kirklees, West Yorkshire, England.

It is named after Dean Head, a village that was mostly submerged during construction of the dam. Construction started in 1838 and it opened a year later, almost 140 years before Scammonden Reservoir (its downstream neighbour) was opened in 1971. Water flowing out of Deanhead forms Black Burne Brook which now feeds into Scammonden Water. Deanhead reservoir was originally constructed to supply water to the factories in the Blackburn Valley that was downstream of the reservoir. During the 1995 drought, the outlines of foundations of buildings in the village were visible.

Deanhead also is the name of a Pennine pass to the south of the reservoir, which carries the A640 from Huddersfield to Denshaw, following the course of a Roman road.

References 

Reservoirs in West Yorkshire